"How Many Tears" is a song written by Gerry Goffin and Carole King.  The song was produced by Snuff Garrett, and performed by Bobby Vee featuring The Johnny Mann Singers.  The song reached #10 in the UK, #43 in Canada, and #63 on the Billboard Hot 100 in 1961.  It was featured on his 1962 album, Bobby Vee's Golden Greats.

The single's B-side, "Baby Face", reached #3 in Australia, #97 in Canada and #119 on the Billboard chart.

Other versions
Tami Lynn released a version as the B-side to her single, "Mojo Hannah" in July 1971.

References

1961 songs
1961 singles
Songs with lyrics by Gerry Goffin
Songs written by Carole King
Bobby Vee songs
Song recordings produced by Snuff Garrett
Liberty Records singles